Coliseo Iván de Bedout is an indoor sporting arena that is located in Medellín, Colombia. The arena is mainly used to host basketball and futsal games. The arena's seating capacity for basketball and futsal games is 6,000. The arena has been a part of the Medellín Sports Coliseum since 2009.

History
Coliseo Iván de Bedout was originally opened in 1955. It has been used as a host basketball arena of the 2010 South American Games, and the 2017 FIBA AmeriCup. It was also used as a host venue of the 2016 FIFA Futsal World Cup.

See also
Medellín Sports Coliseum

References

External links
Interior Image of Coliseo Iván de Bedout

Basketball venues in Colombia
Buildings and structures in Medellín
Indoor arenas in Colombia
Sport in Medellín
Sports venues completed in 1955
Sports venues in Colombia
1955 establishments in Colombia